Elanco Animal Health Incorporated is an American pharmaceutical company which produces medicines and vaccinations for pets and livestock. Until 2019, the company was a subsidiary of Eli Lilly and Company, before being divested. It is the third-largest animal health company in the world.

History
The company can trace its roots back to 1953 when Eli Lilly introduced their first antibiotic aimed at veterinary usage with the new plant and animal sciences research being combined into  Lilly's Agro-Industrial division led by George Barnes. In the 1960s, the Agro-Industrial division was reorganised launching Elanco Products, short for the parent company name, Eli Lilly and Company.

The 1970s marked a decade of expansion for the business, increasing international operations to 38 global affiliates and 17 manufacturing locations. In the 1980s research moved away from plant sciences and focused on animal health and food quality. In the 1990s another reorganisation led to the company being renamed Elanco Animal Health, focusing solely on animal health.

In 2007 the business acquired Ivy Animal Health and launched its companion animal business. In 2008 Elanco partnered with Heifer International in order to address food security in developing nations. In 2009 the business launched its data analytics business, Elanco Knowledge Solutions.

In 2010 the business acquired the European rights to a portfolio of Pfizer Animal Health treatments and an Irish manufacturing site. In 2011, Elanco expanded its footprint in Europe, acquiring Janssen Animal Health and committed to ending hunger for 100,000 families through the Heifer International partnership. In 2012 the business acquired ChemGen Corp., improving their offering in enzyme-based nutrient absorption tools for food-livestock. In 2014, the business acquired Lohmann SE and Lohmann Animal Health for an undisclosed sum and Novartis Animal Health for $5.4 billion, the former boosting Elanco's poultry and vaccine business and the latter increasing a broad spectrum of treatments across companion animal, livestock, vaccine and aquaculture offerings. In 2016 Elanco expanded its US-based business, acquiring a suite of vaccines from Boehringer Ingelheim Vetmedica for $885 million.

In 2013, Elanco made a $100M investment in China Animal Healthcare, a leading manufacturer of Animal pharmaceuticals in China. 

In 2018, Lilly announced plans to separate its Elanco Animal Health unit from the rest of the business via an initial public offering on the New York Stock Exchange, with the stock-ticker ELAN. In 2019, the divestiture was completed and Elanco launched on the New York Stock Exchange. In the same year, the US FDA approved rabacfosadine, a first-in-class treatment for canine lymphoma. The business continued to expand is US-business, acquiring Aratana Therapeutics, and its first-in-class treatment for canine osteoarthritis. Elanco also announced it would acquire the developer of vaccines for bacterial disease prevention in food-animals, Prevtec Microbia, Inc. In the same year the business announced it would acquire Bayer's animal health business for $7.6 billion.

On December 3, 2020, Elanco announced plans to build a new global headquarters in Indianapolis at the site of the former GM stamping plant, which is located across the White River from the downtown area. The business plans to break ground on the new headquarters in the first half of 2021.

In August 2021, Elanco announced it had closed its acquisition of Kindred Biosciences, enhancing its existing biologics and monoclonal antibody pipeline.

Elanco's flea and tick collar, branded "Seresto" and manufactured by Bayer Animal Health which was acquired by Elanco in 2020, has been linked to more than 98,000 incidents of poisoning by pesticide, including more than 2,000 pet deaths, according to a 2022 report by a subcommittee of the House Committee on Oversight and Reform. The collars have been banned in Canada.

Acquisitions

Elanco Products Company (Established 1954 as a division of Eli Lilly and Company)
DowElanco (Established 1989 as joint venture with Dow Chemical, Sold stake 1999 to Dow)
Ivy Animal Health (Acq 2007)
Pfizer Animal Health (Acq 2010)
Janssen Pharmaceutica Animal Health (Acq 2011)
ChemGen Corp (Acq 2012)
Lohmann SE (Acq 2014)
Lohmann Animal Health (Acq 2014)
Novartis Animal Health (Acq 2014)
Bayer Animal Health (Acq 2019)
Kindred Biosciences (Acq 2021)

References

External links

Veterinary medicine companies
Pharmaceutical companies of the United States
Health care companies based in Indiana
Companies listed on the New York Stock Exchange
2018 initial public offerings
Eli Lilly and Company
Veterinary medicine in the United States
Corporate spin-offs